Eupithecia lentiscata is a moth in the  family Geometridae. It is found on Sardinia, Corsica and in southern Greece.

The wingspan is about 17.5 mm. The forewings are brownish grey, with a slightly darker costal margin. The hindwings are paler, whitish grey with a delicate brownish tint.

The larvae feed on Pistacia lentiscus.

References

External links
Lepiforum.de

Moths described in 1869
lentiscata
Moths of Europe
Taxa named by Paul Mabille